The northern mangrove seasnake (Parahydrophis mertoni), also known commonly as the Arafura smooth seasnake, is a species of venomous snake in the family Elapidae. The species is endemic to Australia and New Guinea.

Etymology
The specific name, mertoni, is in honor of German zoologist Hugo Merton.

Geographic range
Parahydrophis mertoni is found in Northern Australia in Northern Territory and Queensland. It is also found in New Guinea in the Arafura Sea.

Description
Parahydrophis mertoni is blackish-olive with about 46 yellow rings on the body and ten on the tail. The head shields are spotted with yellow, except for the rostral and labials which are black.

Reproduction
Parahydrophis mertoni is viviparous.

References

Further reading
Cogger HG (2014). Reptiles and Amphibians of Australia, Seventh Edition. Clayton, Victoria, Australia: CSIRO Publishing. xxx + 1,033 pp. .
Roux J (1910). "Reptilien und Amphibien der Aru- und Kei-Inseln ". Abhandlungen der Senckenbergischen Naturforschenden Gesellschaft 33: 211-247. (Distira mertoni, new species, p. 222 + Plate 13, figures 4 & 4a). (in German).
Wilson, Steve; Swan, Gerry (2013). A Complete Guide to Reptiles of Australia, Fourth Edition. Sydney: New Holland Publishers. 522 pp. .

Elapidae
Snakes of Australia
Reptiles described in 1910
Monotypic snake genera
Sea snakes